Ondřej Bačo (born 25 March 1996) is a Czech footballer.

Club career
He made his Czech First League debut for Fastav Zlín on 18 November 2016 in a game against Vysočina Jihlava.

On 1 August 2021, signed for the Israeli Premier League club Hapoel Jerusalem.

Honours
 Czech Cup
Winner (1): 2016-17

References

External links
 
 
 

1996 births
Living people
Czech footballers
Czech Republic under-21 international footballers
FC Fastav Zlín players
SK Líšeň players
CS Gaz Metan Mediaș players
Hapoel Jerusalem F.C. players
Czech First League players
Czech National Football League players
Liga I players
Israeli Premier League players
Association football defenders
Czech expatriate footballers
Expatriate footballers in Romania
Expatriate footballers in Israel
Czech expatriate sportspeople in Romania
Czech expatriate sportspeople in Israel